Raï'n'B (written Raï&B and Raï/RnB) is a musical genre that appeared in the 2000s in France, with elements of both French contemporary R&B and Algerian raï.

The DJ duo Kore & Skalp established the style and released the ground-breaking compilation album Raï'n'B Fever in 2004 with the best examples of the genre that included rap, R&B and raï. Many further albums were released in the series in 2006 and 2008 (produced by Kore & Bellek), the 2009 special Même pas fatigué and Kore in 2011. Many of the tracks on the album Puissance Raï RnB 2012 were produced by DJ Kim.

References

Contemporary R&B genres
French rhythm and blues
Raï